The women's team pursuit competition at the 2020  UEC European Track Championships was held on 11 and 12 November 2020.

Results

Qualifying
All teams advanced to the first round.

First round
First round heats were held as follows:

Heat 1: 1st v 4th fastest
Heat 2: 2nd v 3rd fastest

The winners of each heat proceeded to the gold medal race. The remaining two teams proceeded to the bronze medal race.

Finals

References

Women's team pursuit
European Track Championships – Women's team pursuit